Magdalena Roze (born 1982) is an Australian (with Polish heritage) meteorologist, weather presenter and journalist.

Early life 

Roze was a scholarship holder and graduate from the University of Sydney where she completed a Bachelor of Arts in Media and Communication. In addition to her media qualification, Roze completed a Graduate Diploma in Atmospheric Science at Macquarie University, winning the 2009 Biophysical Environments Prize and the Australian Meteorological and Oceanographic Society Prize for her academic achievements.

She has also completed a meteorological training course at the Bureau of Meteorology and been invited back to Macquarie University as a guest lecturer.

Career

Roze has been an anchor, weather presenter and meteorologist at the Weather Channel and guest appearances as a weather expert and commentator on prime time radio and television programs across Australia.

Roze joined Network Ten in October 2011 and became a weather presenter on Ten News at Five: Weekend.

In January 2012, Roze joined Network Ten's Breakfast as weather presenter. She broadcast from London during the 2012 London Olympics. She was the weather presenter on Ten Morning News from August 2012.

Roze filled in as the newsreader on Ten Morning News and guest co-hosted The Project.

In March 2014, Roze's contract was not renewed by Network Ten.

In August 2014, Roze appeared on Sunrise, on the Kochie's Angels segment.

In February 2015, Roze made an appearance presenting weather on ABC News Victoria. Whether she has secured a contract with a network is unclear yet.

Recognition 
In 2010 Roze accepted the ASTRA Award for Best News Coverage for the Weather Channel's reporting of the Black Saturday bushfires, and in 2011 was nominated for Best News Coverage and Most Outstanding Performance by a Broadcast Journalist.

Personal life
In January 2015, Roze announced that she was engaged to partner Darren Robertson. The couple have two sons.

References

External links

1982 births
Australian meteorologists
Living people
Macquarie University alumni
People educated at James Ruse Agricultural High School
10 News First presenters
University of Sydney alumni
Weather presenters